Frederic Remington: The Truth of Other Days is a 1991 documentary film of American Western artist Frederic Remington made for the PBS series American Masters. It was produced and directed by Tom Neff and written by Neff and Louise LeQuire.  Actor Gregory Peck narrated the film and Ned Beatty was the voice of Remington when reading his correspondence.

The documentary was produced by the Metropolitan Museum of Art, New York; NHK Corporation (Japan); and Polaris Entertainment, Nashville, Tennessee.  It was the first documentary to be filmed in High Definition Television (HDTV), but at the time it was years away from high-definition television broadcasting.

Synopsis
This documentary of Frederic Remington reviews how the artist popularized the myths, legends, and images of the "Old West".

The film was filmed on location where Remington spent time, uses archival film and photographs, and has interviews with art scholars that create a framework to understand his artwork.

Interviews
 Gregory Peck as narrator
 Ned Beatty as voice of Frederic Remington
 William Howze
 Lewis Sharp
 Brian W. Dippie
 Peter Hassrick

Reception

Critical response
When the film was shown on PBS, Walter Goodman, television critic for The New York Times, liked the film, and wrote, "In these multi-cultural times, it may not come as unadulterated praise to credit someone with defining America's vision of the Old West, but Frederic Remington: The Truth of Other Days illuminates the artist's achievement without subjecting it to a test for political correctness. Setting Remington's paintings and sculptures against his own words, crisply delivered by Ned Beatty, the hourlong American Masters documentary, tonight at 9 on Channel 13, shows and tells how the Easterner helped create a Western myth that has not yet lost its power...Attention is drawn especially to the way the massed figures move on both canvas and screen, from upper right to lower left. Big men in a landscape of big nature was a steady theme of both the movie maker and the painter."

Awards
Wins
 CINE: CINE Golden Eagle, 1990.

References

External links
 Tom Neff official web site (see Films for film clip)
 
 

1991 films
1991 documentary films
American documentary films
American Masters films
American independent films
Documentary films about painters
Films directed by Tom Neff
Frederic Remington
1991 independent films
1990s English-language films
1990s American films